Ersen Martin (born 23 May 1979) is a Turkish former professional footballer who played as a forward.

He amassed Süper Lig totals of 256 games and 73 goals over the course of 12 seasons, in representation of ten clubs.

Club career
Born in Marktredwitz, West Germany, Ersen started playing for 1. FC Nürnberg, his Bundesliga input consisting in 20 minutes in a 1–0 away loss against SC Freiburg in 1998–99. After that sole season he switched to Turkey, going on to represent Beşiktaş JK, Siirtspor, Göztepe AS, Denizlispor and Ankaraspor.

In the 2006–07 campaign, Ersen represented Trabzonspor, finishing the season as the league's eighth best-scorer and helping his team finish fourth, good enough for qualification to the UEFA Cup. Subsequently, he had everything arranged with La Liga club Recreativo de Huelva in August 2007, but the deal eventually collapsed and he stayed at Trabzonspor; in October, FIFA stepped in and declared Ersen a player of the Spanish side– he had dual citizenship, but that status changed with 2007 changes in German laws and so, he eventually played his first season for the Andalusians as a foreign player.

On 3 February 2008, Ersen finally made his Recreativo debut, on a sour note as Sevilla FC won 2–1 away and he was sent off for a reckless challenge after just eight minutes as a substitute. On 27 April he got his first start and scored his first goal for Recre, also assisting Javier Camuñas in a 2–0 home win that sent Levante UD to the second division.

On 1 July 2009, Ersen signed a two-year deal with Sivasspor, ending speculation he would be joining Scotland's Heart of Midlothian. On 4 August he netted his first competitive goal for the club, in the third qualifying round of the UEFA Champions League: on the 12th minute of the second leg against R.S.C. Anderlecht he scored the team's first ever in the competition, in a 3–1 home victory (6–3 loss on aggregate).

After a poor first half of 2009–10, Ersen switched to Manisaspor. Overall, he finished the year with no goals and his teams ranked just above the relegation zone (15th and 14th).

International career
Ersen received his first cap for the Turkey national team on 18 August 2004, in a 2–1 friendly home loss to Belarus. He appeared in a further two internationals two years later, also in exhibition games.

Personal life
Martin's younger brother, Erkan, was also a footballer.

References

External links

1979 births
Living people
People from Marktredwitz
Sportspeople from Upper Franconia
German people of Turkish descent
German footballers
Footballers from Bavaria
Turkish footballers
Association football forwards
Bundesliga players
1. FC Nürnberg players
Süper Lig players
TFF First League players
Beşiktaş J.K. footballers
Göztepe S.K. footballers
Denizlispor footballers
Ankaraspor footballers
Trabzonspor footballers
Sivasspor footballers
Kasımpaşa S.K. footballers
Gençlerbirliği S.K. footballers
Eyüpspor footballers
La Liga players
Recreativo de Huelva players
Turkey under-21 international footballers
Turkey B international footballers
Turkey international footballers
German expatriate footballers
Turkish expatriate footballers
Expatriate footballers in Spain
German expatriate sportspeople in Spain
Turkish expatriate sportspeople in Spain